Most films are subject to copyright, but those listed here are believed to be in the public domain in the United States. This means that no government, organization, or individual owns any copyright over the work, and as such it is common property. This list is not comprehensive; the vast majority of public domain films are not included here for various reasons. Films in this list may incorporate elements from other works that are still under copyright, even though the film itself is out of copyright.

Copyrightable elements of a film 

There is no official list of films (or other works) in the public domain. It is difficult to determine the public domain status of a film because it can incorporate any or all of the following copyrightable elements:
 Cinematography
 Drama
 Literature
 Music
 Art
 Graphical characters (e.g., Bugs Bunny)
 Fictional characters (e.g., James Bond)

Film copyright involves the copyright status of multiple elements that make up the film. A film can lose its copyright in some of those elements while retaining copyright in other elements. Experts in the field of public domain sometimes differ in their opinions as to whether a particular film is in the public domain.

The use of music in a film can cause uncertainty with regard to copyright. As of 2010, it is not known whether the use of music in a film constitutes publication of the music for the purpose of copyright. Unpublished works are treated differently from published works under US copyright law.

Judicial interpretation of public domain
Judges, too, differ in their interpretation of the laws governing copyright protection. The United States is a "patchwork quilt" of inconsistent copyright rules in different federal judicial districts. The courts of one jurisdiction are not obliged to follow the decisions of another. The Supreme Court of the United States (which could resolve those inconsistencies) very seldom decides copyright cases, and then only when an important principle is involved.

Documenting public domain status

If a film appears on the list below, there is a high probability it has lost some or all of its United States copyright protection or, in the case of U.S. government films, was never protected by copyright.

There is no single method for determining if a film, or parts of it, is in the public domain. There are several methods that can be used to document a film's public domain status. These include the following:

Determining copyright registration
Motion picture copyright registrations prior to 1978 were published in semi-annual Copyright Catalogs. The Library of Congress also published cumulative Copyright Catalogs of motion picture registrations for the periods

 1894–1911
 1912–1939
 1940–1949
 1950–1959
 1960–1969
 1970–1979
 1980–1989

All are out of print. However, the Film Superlist series is a complete reprint of all registrations in the Copyright Catalogs for 1894 through 1959. There is no cumulative Copyright Catalog for 1970–1977; the Copyright Office published 16 semi-annual Copyright Catalog booklets covering that eight-year period, but all are out of print and extremely rare. All copyright registrations from 1978 onward are online at the Library of Congress website.

Some decades of The American Film Institute Catalog of Motion Pictures include copyright registration information for feature films (not shorts) of United States origin. This can include a statement that research failed to disclose copyright registration for a particular film. Copyright registration information is given in the following:
 The American Film Institute Catalog of Motion Pictures, 1931–1940; 
 The American Film Institute Catalog of Motion Pictures, 1941–1950; 

The United States copyright website catalogs all the pre-1978 works that have been renewed in 1978 or later. Several pieces of work have been renewed in the form of collections, thus giving the collection as a whole copyright protection.

Missing or flawed copyright notice

Films published before March 1, 1989, had to contain a valid copyright notice in order to claim copyright. At the bare minimum, the copyright notice had to include the word "copyright" or an acceptable abbreviation (like a circled C), the year of publication (which could not be more than one year ahead of the actual publication), and the name of any entity claiming the copyright.

For example, episodes of the animated TV series The New 3 Stooges were published with an incomplete copyright notice with a year and copyright symbol but no claimant. The series was published prior to 1989, and the lack of an explicit claimant ensured that the series immediately lapsed into the public domain. Had the series been published after this date, the owner of any copyright would have been unclear due to uncertainty over ownership of the series.

As a result of the passage of the Berne Convention Implementation Act of 1988, a copyright notice is not required for films published on March 1, 1989, or later. An invalid notice or a lack of one would not invalidate the copyright to works published between 1978 and March 1, 1989, as long as a proper notice was added to subsequent copies.

Date of publication and renewal status
All motion pictures made and exhibited before  are indisputably in the public domain in the United States.

The semi-annual Copyright Catalog booklets have virtually complete lists of renewals for the films registered 28 years earlier. Those semi-annual booklets all are out of print. However, for  through 1959, the Film Superlist books match copyright renewals with earlier registrations. Copyright registrations and renewals can be found in
 Volume 1 : Motion Pictures in the U.S. Public Domain 1894–1939
 Volume 2 : Motion Pictures in the U.S. Public Domain 1940–1949
 Volume 3 : Motion Pictures in the U.S. Public Domain 1950–1959

As a result of the Copyright Renewal Act of 1992, copyrights registered between 1964 and later were automatically renewed.

Before the passage of the Copyright Term Extension Act (CTEA) in 1998, the term of copyright in the U.S. was a maximum of 75 years, with the work entering the public domain on January 1 of the 76th year from creation (so, for example, a film made in 1930 whose copyright was properly registered and renewed would enter the public domain on January 1, 2006). As such, all films released before 1923 would have entered the public domain by January 1, 1998. Although the CTEA added 20 years to the terms of all existing copyrights until 2019, it explicitly refused to revive any copyrights that had expired prior to its passage. On January 1, 2019, the 20-year extension expired and new works began entering the public domain each year thereafter.

Underlying rights
Many of the movies listed below are based on novels, plays, magazine stories or a combination of these sources. In some cases, a film's copyright has lapsed because of non-renewal while the underlying literary or dramatic source is still protected by copyright; for example, the movie His Girl Friday (1940) became a public domain film in 1969 because it was not renewed, but it is based on the 1928 play The Front Page, which is still under copyright until 2024 and thus, as a practical matter, the film cannot be used without permission.

Work of the United States government

All works made by United States government employees as part of their official duties are in the public domain from their creation. The status of works made by contractors is dependent on the terms of their contract. Note that this applies only to the federal government, and not to state or local governments, which may or may not claim copyright depending on state laws.

Films

Some films are not listed here in order to keep this list to a manageable size. These include films that were released before  (see :Category:Films by year for pre- films) and works of the United States government. Films released under a free license such as Creative Commons are also excluded on the basis they are not technically in the public domain, despite being free to share and use.

See also

 History of film
 List of open-source films
 Lists of films
 List of animated films in the public domain in the United States
 List of years in film
 Open-source film
 Outline of film
 List of public domain works with multimedia adaptations
 Public domain in the United States
 The Story of Film: An Odyssey

Notes
  Public domain in the U.S. from creation as work of the United States government

References

Bibliography

 
 

Public domain
Public domain
Public domain in the United States